The HD Pentax-DA 645 28-45mm F4.5 ED AW SR is a wide angle zoom lens for the Pentax 645 medium format system, announced by Ricoh on August 4, 2014.

References
http://www.dpreview.com/products/pentax/lenses/pentax_hd_da_645ed_28-45_f4p5_aw_sr/specifications

Camera lenses introduced in 2014
028-045